Sandra Sassine  (born September 28, 1979) is a Canadian fencer. She was born in Chibougamau, Quebec. She competed in the individual and team sabre events at the 2008 Summer Olympics. In the women's sabre in 2008, she competed in section 3, beating Elvira Wood in the first round, but was eliminated in the second round by gold medalist Mariel Zagunis. She placed 28th overall. She was a member of the Canadian team that finished in 7th place in the team sabre event.

She competed in the women's individual sabre event at the 2012 Summer Olympics where she lost to Aleksandra Socha in the first round.

References

External links
  Official website
 Biographie Canadian Fencing Federation

1979 births
Living people
Canadian female fencers
Fencers at the 2007 Pan American Games
Fencers at the 2008 Summer Olympics
Fencers at the 2011 Pan American Games
Fencers at the 2012 Summer Olympics
French Quebecers
Olympic fencers of Canada
People from Chibougamau
Sportspeople from Quebec
Pan American Games silver medalists for Canada
Pan American Games bronze medalists for Canada
Pan American Games medalists in fencing
Medalists at the 2011 Pan American Games